"No Good (Start the Dance)" is a song by English electronic music group the Prodigy. Written and produced by group member Liam Howlett, it was released on 16 May 1994 as the second single from their second studio album, Music for the Jilted Generation (1994). It is built around a repeated vocal sample from "You're No Good for Me" by Kelly Charles (1987). Howlett initially had doubts whether to use the sample because he thought it was too pop for his taste. The song also contains samples from "Funky Nassau" by Bahamian funk group the Beginning of the End. It was certified Gold in Germany for 250,000 sold copies.

In 2012, NME listed "No Good (Start the Dance)" at number 33 in their list of "100 Best Songs of the 1990s".

Chart performance
"No Good (Start the Dance)" was quite successful on the singles chart across Europe and also the band's most successful single release up to that point. The song peaked at number one in both Finland and Greece, and was a number two hit in the Netherlands. In the latter, it held that position on the Dutch Top 40 for one week in August 1994, being held off the top spot by 2 Brothers on the 4th Floor's "Dreams (Will Come Alive)". "No Good (Start the Dance)" entered the top 10 also in Austria (6), Belgium (7), Germany (4), Iceland (4), Norway (7), Scotland (7) and the UK. In the latter, it peaked at number four in its fourth week on the UK Singles Chart on July 12, 1994. It spent two more weeks within the top 10, before leaving. On the UK Dance Singles Chart, the song also peaked at number four. Additionally, it was a top 20 hit in Denmark (19) and Spain (12), as well as on the Eurochart Hot 100, where it hit number ten in June same year. In Sweden, "No Good (Start the Dance)" was a top 30 hit, peaking at number 22.

The single earned a gold record in the UK, with a sale of 400,000 units.

Critical reception
John Bush from AllMusic complimented the song as "excellent". British Lennox Herald described it as "rough and ready". In his weekly UK chart commentary, James Masterton noted that it "uses a previously successful formula of combining their mix of hardcore rave beats with an annoyingly commercial sampled hook." He added, "The sample in question will annoy me for months". Maria Jimenez from Music & Media declared it an "beatbreaker". Andy Beevers from Music Week gave it four out of five, calling it "another rough and rugged hardcore track. They still have plenty of grassroot support and will continue to outsell other hardcore acts by a big margin." 

NME named it one of The Prodigy’s "finest singles", with its "scuzzy euphoria and thumping bass." Brad Beatnik from the RM Dance Update wrote, "The first Prodigy release for more than a year sees them working up a typically frenetic hard groove with a neat wobbly bassline and standard 'no good for me' vocals." He concluded, "Massive chart action expected". Another editor, James Hamilton, described it as a "typical frantic hardcore 145 2-0bpm [track]". Gareth Grundy from Select stated that Liam Howlett's "jungle and hardcore roots are still present, but he injects some space and gracious melody between the coruscating rhythm."

Music video
The song's accompanying music video, directed by Walter Stern combines the humorous flavour of that for the band's previous video for "Out of Space" with the menace of "Firestarter" and "Breathe" videos to come. Filmed in a disused, underground cellar below Spitalfields market in the East End of London, the video features characters dancing to the song whilst the band members prowl around moodily. After Howlett breaks down a plaster wall with a sledgehammer, group member Keith Flint is seen in a straitjacket, eventually being locked into a Plexiglas box-prison which begins to fill with smoke. "No Good (Start the Dance)" received heavy rotation on MTV Europe, power play on France's MCM and was A-listed on Germany's VIVA in August 1994.

Liam Howlett said to Dazed magazine "No Good... was a response to all that shit Eurodance stuff"'', and said that the band had started to make better videos. The music video became the last music video to be played on the music channel NME TV directly before its closure at 6:00am on 5 January 2012.

Track listing

XL recordings
12" vinyl record
"No Good (Start the Dance)" (Original Mix) – 6:22
"No Good (Start the Dance)" (Bad for You Mix) – 6:52 (remixed by Liam Howlett)
"No Good (Start the Dance)" (CJ Bolland Museum Mix) – 5:14

CD single
"No Good (Start the Dance)" (Edit) – 4:01
"No Good (Start the Dance)" (Bad for You Mix) – 6:52 (remixed by Liam Howlett)
"No Good (Start the Dance)" (CJ Bolland Museum Mix) – 5:14
"No Good (Start the Dance)" (Original Mix) – 6:22

Sony/Dancepool
"No Good (Start the Dance)" (Edit) – 4:01
"No Good (Start the Dance)" (CJ Bolland's Mix) – 5:14
"One Love" (Jonny L Remix) – 5:10
"Jericho" (Genaside II Remix) – 5:45
"G-Force" (Energy Flow) – 5:18

Charts and certifications

Weekly charts

Year-end charts

Certifications

Fedde Le Grand and Sultan & Ned Shepard version

In 2013,  Dutch house DJ and producer Fedde le Grand and Canadian electronic music duo Sultan & Ned Shepard released a remake of the hit on Spinnin' Records.

The single charted in SNEP, the official French Singles Chart as well as in the "bubbling under" Ultratip in the Belgian (Wallonia) French market Singles Chart.Track list"No Good" (club edit) (3:00)
"No Good" (extended mix) (5:17)Charts'''

References

Songs about dancing
The Prodigy songs
1994 singles
XL Recordings singles
Songs written by Liam Howlett
Black-and-white music videos
Music videos directed by Walter Stern
1994 songs
Spinnin' Records singles
Number-one singles in Finland
Number-one singles in Greece